Ben Lievesley Collins (born 13 February 1975) is a racing driver from Bristol, England. He has competed in motor racing since 1994 in many categories, from Formula Three and Indy Lights to sportscars, GT racing and stock cars.

Collins was placed second in the Marlboro Masters Formula 3 championship event in 2000. He set the pace at the 2001 Le Mans 24 hours race in his first season for approximately four hours during the rain at night. After winning the European Stock Car Championship in 2003 ASCAR stock car racing he was signed by PDM Racing to do selected rounds of the 2004 Indy Racing League, but the car never appeared. In 2005, he competed in the British GT Championship in a Porsche 996 GT3, winning races on the way before moving up to the FIA GT Series with Ascari where he led races and scored several pole positions.

In addition to racing, Collins' company Collins Autosport Limited provides precision and stunt driving services, particularly for BBC Television, including Top Gear and Top Gear Live, as well as for the film industry, such as driving James Bond's car in Quantum of Solace and Casino Royale, and Eve Moneypenny's car in Skyfall.

In August 2010, The Sunday Times alleged that Collins may be one of the identities of The Stig—an otherwise unidentified presenter on the Top Gear show—on the basis of financial filing made by the Collins Autosport company. On 1 September 2010 the BBC was refused a court injunction preventing Collins from publishing an autobiography revealing himself to be The Stig. On 1 October 2010, it was announced that Collins would join Fifth Gear as a presenter. In 2012 Collins joined as co-presenter of Polish TVN's Automaniak. In February 2014, he was added to the 'Drivers Club' of the newly formed Formula E series, but did not compete in the inaugural 2014–15 season.

Personal life
Collins was born in Bristol, but spent the first ten years of his life in California in the US, where his father worked for a distribution company. Collins attended Blundell's School and after studying law at the University of Exeter, he spent around four years serving in the British Army, serving some of his time as a Special Forces driving instructor. His racing career started in 1994. He worked for Hornby as brand manager of the Scalextric model slot car division.   Collins continued to live in Bristol.

Racing

Collins has competed in motorsport since 1994. In 1995 he competed in Formula Vauxhall Junior, finishing third overall with two wins and eight podiums. He also competed in the Formula Opel Winter Series, placing second overall driving for Sir Jackie Stewart who commented in Autosport Magazine, "When you see the likes of Ben Collins in Formula One, remember you saw them here first". The following season he competed briefly in Formula Vauxhall for Martin Donnelly, scoring a 2nd-place finish in the opening round at Donington Park - Martin remarked that "Ben is an aggressive driver with phenomenal natural speed."

Collins moved onto the British Formula 3 Championship in 1996. In 1997, he finished eighth in the standings driving for Fortec Motorsport, and also finished eighth in the Macau Grand Prix. After another year in Formula Three in 1998, Collins raced in the American Indy Lights series in 1999, finishing thirteen in the standings. For 2000, he returned to British F3 to drive for Carlin Motorsport, once again finishing eighth. He also finished second in the 2000 Masters of Formula 3 race at Zandvoort.
Collins has been a test driver for racing manufacturer Ascari during Ascari A10 development, and undertaken testing of Formula One cars.

In 2001, Collins raced in the FIA Sportscar Championship for Team Ascari, with Werner Lupberger, the pair winning at Donington Park and finishing joint sixth in the standings. The team also raced at the 2001 24 Hours of Le Mans. Collins also finished sixth at the 2002 12 Hours of Sebring for Ascari.

In 2003, Collins raced in the ASCAR European Oval racing series with RML, winning six races on his way to being crowned champion. He continued racing in the series in 2004.

Collins returned to sportscars in 2005 to race in the British GT Championship and FIA GT Championship with Embassy Racing, placing 3rd in the series.

In 2006 he rejoined Ascari, racing in the FIA GT3 European Championship.

In 2007 Collins tested a NASCAR Cup Series car at Lakeland Speedway with the Red Bull Racing Team.

In 2009 Collins was named as an endurance driver for Australian V8 Supercars team, Kelly Racing/Jack Daniel's Racing, partnering with Nathan Pretty.

In the 2010 Le Mans Series season, he was racing for RML AD Group. His first race for the team was the 2010 1000 km of Algarve, finishing fourth overall and winning the LMP2 class. He remained with the team for the next round, the 2010 1000 km of Hungaroring, where they finished fourth in both class and overall.

Collins competed in the final meeting of the 2010 Dunlop MSA British Touring Car Championship, driving a BMW for the Motorbase Performance team. He finished his first race in 14th and bettered that with a 12th in his second. However he retired in the third and he never returned the following season.

In 2021, Collins once again found himself behind a racing wheel as he took part in the Britcar Praga Championship alongside ex-SAS and Who Dares Wins star Jay Morton and Angus Fender. The pair drive the 85 car, nicknamed Blade. They're currently P7 in the championship on 114 points as of the cancelled meet at Brands Hatch in July.

In 2022, Collins took part in the inaugural season of the Praga Cup.

Collins Autosport
Collins is a regular writer for Autosport magazine testing the latest racing cars, has written for The Sunday Times, fronted Sky Sports' televised NASCAR coverage, along with appearances on the British car-focused television programmes Top Gear (BBC Two), Pulling Power (ITV1) and driven (Channel 4).

He worked as a precision-driver in the film National Treasure: Book of Secrets where he doubled for the actor Nicolas Cage and drove in some of the high-speed sequences in London. As a precision-driver in the 2008-film Quantum of Solace, Collins drove James Bond's Aston Martin DBS as a stunt double for Daniel Craig in the lead role. He has also worked as a stunt driver on Skyfall and Spectre.

He also holds a World Record for the maximum distance of driving a car on two wheels (a manoeuvre called "skiing").

Collins presented television programme Xtreme Teen Drivers, shown on BBC Three on 15 December 2007; as an advanced driving instructor within the programme, he was trying to teach a young boy racer to drive more safely.

Collins' company Ben Collins Auto-sport has provided its logistics and third-party liability insurance for prize-winner track day events promoted by Top Gear magazine.

Top Gear
Collins has appeared on the popular BBC television programme Top Gear as himself, with his company providing drivers and driving services since December 2003. In Series 2 Episode 10, Collins appeared as one member of BBC Top Gear-team in the 24-hour Citroën 2CV racing event. The team finished thirteenth, out of thirty four cars, 24 laps behind the leaders, with Collins setting the fastest lap.

In 2004, Collins made an appearance during the fourth series of Top Gear, alongside parachutist Tim Carter. The stunt involved Carter and an aerial cameraman jumping out of a Cessna light aircraft then landing in the open-topped Mercedes car being driven at a speed by Collins. The open-top car was introduced as belonging to Collins and had earlier been used, driven by The Stig, during a wig test in Series 3 Episode 5.

In 2004, the driver featured in the second episode of series five, driving a Lancer Evo VII and then a Bowler Wildcat vehicle in a rally race against mountain boarding world champion Tom Kirkman

At the start of series six, Collins appeared with other British Touring Car Championship racing and stunt drivers for a Five-a-side football game using a fleet of Toyota Aygo cars. Collins played in a team captained by Top Gear presenter Richard Hammond. The other drivers were Paul Swift, Tim Harvey and Tom Chilton (blue team); playing against James May, Russ Swift, Matt Neal, Dan Eaves and Rob Huff (red team).

Collins could be seen driving the Honda Civic Type-R against Jeremy Clarkson in Episode 6 of Series 10.

The sixth episode of series seventeen of Top Gear featured a team of amputee soldiers training driving a Bowler Wildcat and being trained by Collins to take part in the Dakar Rally.

Collins also appeared in the Top Gear Special, '50 Years of Bond Cars', on the set of Skyfall. Collins, who worked as a stunt driver on the film was interviewed by Richard Hammond.

On a separate occasion, following an accident involving Richard Hammond in September 2006, the Health & Safety Executive report into the event recorded that Collins had "worked closely with Top Gear as a high-performance driver and consultant" and had prepared a briefing for Richard Hammond preceding the event.

The Stig 

On 19 January 2009, British newspaper The Daily Telegraph ran a story claiming that they had "outed" Collins as being one of the people behind the white-suit incarnation of The Stig, at the same time noting that "Collins, from Bristol, has always denied being the Stig".

The Times, in a follow-up article, stated that the "identity of the white-suited Stig ... has been an open secret within the motoring world for some years, with newspapers refraining from publishing his name, to uphold the spirit of the programme" which concluded that "a newspaper broke with the convention to out Mr Collins, 33, after following up a story in a Bristol newspaper".
Similar allegations were repeated by The Sunday Times during August 2010.

Two Bristol-based local newspapers had published articles a week before The Times in January 2009, on the basis of information leaked from a local art gallery. Collins had previously commissioned a Clifton-based business in September 2008, to produce a limited-edition run of poster prints. Collins had initially portrayed himself as a BBC marketing executive and only confirmed a more detailed connection to the Top Gear show after the signing of confidentiality agreements by the business owners.
The signed poster image showed a salt flat scene, with The Stig positioned standing on it.

However, at the time Top Gear presenter James May claimed that the Stig's identity had not been outed.  There had been speculation that there may have been more than one person who plays the Stig.

Autobiography publication 

During August to September 2010 the BBC started legal proceedings against Harper Collins, with the BBC attempting to obtain a High Court injunction to prevent the publishing of a book entitled The Man in The White Suit, apparently authored by Collins. The injunction was quashed by the High Court, allowing the possibility of the book being published on its intended release date of 16 September 2010 in the United Kingdom and 1 October 2010 in Australia.

In an exclusive interview with WitneyTV recorded on 3 September 2010 and broadcast on 7 September 2010, Top Gear-presenter Jeremy Clarkson confirmed that Collins had worked as The Stig, and that Collins was "history as far as we're concerned, he's sacked". On 7/8 September 2010, The Guardian and other papers re-reported Clarkson's assertions in the interview that Collins had been fired from his role on the television show.

In the fifteenth series Christmas special, Top Gear presenters referred to the Stig as "The Splitter" and publicly ridiculed the Stig, using the picture of the Stig for drive-by shooting targets.

During Collins' appearance with the military amputees broadcast in July 2011, Collins was introduced and acknowledged by Top Gear-presenter Richard Hammond as "ex-Stig ... Ben Collins". Though Hammond still referred to Collins as a "romantic novelist", he said that "to be honest, [he was] quite glad to see 'the old Splitter' back, and [he does] know how much giving these guys a hand means to him. So this is all right."

In his appearance in the Top Gear Special, '50 Years of Bond Cars', Collins was wearing a T-shirt on which was printed the words, "I AM THE STIG." Richard Hammond, (who interviewed Collins) reacted, saying to him, "Nice T-shirt by the way." Collins admitted that he needs to "update that a bit", pointing to the word "AM", to which Hammond exclaimed, "Was." After hearing about some of what Collins had been doing for the film, Hammond remarked, "You should write a book."

Fifth Gear
Collins joined the presenting staff of Channel 5's Fifth Gear in Series 18, participating in racing challenges on several occasions. He did not return to the cast for Series 19.

Other work

Following his departure from Top Gear, Collins has subsequently appeared on the "Top Gear Live" touring show. He appeared onstage in a show in Poland and also served as a racing driver for at least one pre-recorded clip. Introducing him, Clarkson joked Collins' was "living rough", in a racing track paddock, as Collins was shown to be sleeping on cardboard with a shopping trolley with books and Daniel Craig face cuttouts for his possessions. Collins' role was identical to his previous one as the Stig, except wearing an open face helmet and he was referred to as "The Ben Collins" by Clarkson. He has written a second book, How To Drive: The Ultimate Guide, from the Man Who Was The Stig, published in 2014.

Collins served as a consultant during the development of Project CARS and Project CARS 2.

In 2007 Collins started a career as a stunt driver in the Nicolas Cage movie National Treasure 2. This followed by multiple films for the James Bond franchise and other blockbusters including The Dark Knight Rises, Solo: A Star Wars Story, Jack Ryan, and Mission Impossible. He had a dual role as a stunt driver and actor in Ford v Ferrari / Le Mans '66 in the role of Denny Hulme.

Racing career

24 Hours of Le Mans results

Britcar 24 Hour results

Complete V8 Supercar Championship results

Complete British Touring Car Championship results
(key) (Races in bold indicate pole position – 1 point awarded in first race) (Races in italics indicate fastest lap – 1 point awarded all races) (* signifies that driver lead race for at least one lap – 1 point given all races)

References

External links

 Official website

1975 births
Living people
Sportspeople from Bristol
English racing drivers
Indy Lights drivers
British Formula Three Championship drivers
24 Hours of Le Mans drivers
English television presenters
European Le Mans Series drivers
Special Air Service soldiers
People educated at Blundell's School
Alumni of the University of Exeter
British stunt performers
FIA World Endurance Championship drivers
24 Hours of Spa drivers
Top Gear people
ASCAR drivers
Britcar 24-hour drivers
Britcar drivers
British GT Championship drivers
Carlin racing drivers
RC Motorsport drivers
Kelly Racing drivers
Fortec Motorsport drivers